Ronald Foote Robertson  PRCPE (27 December 1920–11 April 1991) was a 20th-century Scottish physician who served as president of the British Medical Association 1983/4 and president of the Royal College of Physicians of Edinburgh for the period 1976 to 1979. He was official Physician in Scotland to Queen Elizabeth II. He was affectionately known as Ronnie Robertson.

Life

He was born in Aberdeen on 27 December 1920, the son of Mary Foot and Thomas Robertson. He was educated at Perth Academy, where he was dux, then studied medicine at the University of Edinburgh graduating with an MB ChB in 1945. He was a clinical tutor at the Edinburgh Royal Infirmary and gained his doctorate (MD) in 1953.

He was Consultant Physician at both the Deaconess and Leith Hospital then returned to Edinburgh Royal Infirmary, where he remained for the rest of his career. He became a Fellow of the Royal College of Physicians of Edinburgh in 1953 and in 1976 succeeded John Crofton as their President. He was succeeded in turn in 1979 by John Anderson Strong.

He served numerous senior medical roles and was the Queen's official physician for eight years, during which time he was created a Commander of the Order of the British Empire (CBE) in 1980. His less known roles include advisor to the Scottish Home and Health Department, to various life insurance companies and to the Merchant Company of Edinburgh.

He was elected to the Aesculapian Club in 1969.  In 1986 he was president of the Harveian Society. 

He died on 11 April 1991.

Family
He married Dorothy Tweedy Wilkinson in 1949, together they had three daughters, one of which is deceased.

Artistic Recognition

His portrait by Ian Hughes is held by the Royal College of Physicians of Edinburgh.

Publications

Some Aspects of Neurology (1968)
Liver Disease (1972)

References

1920 births
1991 deaths
People from Aberdeen
People educated at Perth Academy
Alumni of the University of Edinburgh
Commanders of the Order of the British Empire
Presidents of the Royal College of Physicians of Edinburgh
20th-century Scottish medical doctors